Soul of a Nation is an American six-part television documentary series which premiered on March 2, 2021 on ABC.

Episodes

Series overview

Season 1

Specials

References

External links

2020s American documentary television series
2020s American television miniseries
2021 American television series debuts
2021 American television series endings
American Broadcasting Company original programming
English-language television shows
Historical television series